Gulshan-e-Osman is a new residential neighbourhood of Gadap Town in Karachi, Sindh, Pakistan.

There are several ethnic groups in Gulshan-e-Osman including Muhajirs, Sindhis, Punjabis, Kashmiris, Seraikis, Pakhtuns, Balochis, Memons, Bohras, Ismailis, etc. Over 99% of the population is Muslim. The population of Gadap Town is estimated to be nearly one million.The owner of the colony is Taha ahmed bhatti.

See also
 Gadap Town
 Saadi Town
 Sanober cottages
 Malir Cantonment

References

External links 
 Official Karachi Website 

Neighbourhoods of Karachi